The Swansea Festival of Music and the Arts is an annual arts festival that takes place in Swansea, Wales.

The 2008 festival was its 60th anniversary.

References
 Official Site

Mass media and culture in Swansea
Festivals in Wales
Cultural festivals in the United Kingdom
Music in Swansea